The Terrible People is a 1928 American adventure silent film serial directed by Spencer Gordon Bennet, based on the 1926 novel of the same name by Edgar Wallace. It was released as a 10-chapter serial. The film is now considered to be lost.

Most of the books of Edgar Wallace have been adapted into films many times over the years in both England in the 1930s, and in Germany in the 1960s in a series known as the crimis. The Terrible People was remade as a German crimi film under the same title in 1960.

Plot
An heiress is threatened by the gang of a criminal who seems to have returned from the dead. Clay Shelton was executed for his crimes, but it seems he has returned to life to exact revenge on the people responsible for his death.

Cast
 Allene Ray as Nora Sanders
 Walter Miller as Arnold Long
 Larry Steers as Jack Crayley
 Al Craven as Joshua Monkford (as Allen Craven)
 Alyce McCormick as Alice Cravel
 Wilfrid North as Godley Long
 Frederick Vroom as Clayton Shelton (as Fred Vroom)
 Thomas Holding as Sonny Cravel
 Gilbert Clayton as Krill
 Billy Bletcher as Proody (as William Bletcher)

See also
 List of film serials
 List of film serials by studio
 Films based on works by Edgar Wallace

References

External links

1928 films
1928 lost films
1928 adventure films
American adventure films
American silent serial films
American black-and-white films
Films directed by Spencer Gordon Bennet
Lost American films
Pathé Exchange film serials
Lost adventure films
1920s American films
Silent adventure films